Mario Pestano García (born 8 April 1978 in Tenerife) is a retired male Spanish discus thrower. His personal best throw is 69.50, achieved on 27 July 2008 in Santa Cruz de Tenerife.

Achievements

External links

 

1978 births
Living people
Spanish male discus throwers
Athletes (track and field) at the 2004 Summer Olympics
Athletes (track and field) at the 2008 Summer Olympics
Athletes (track and field) at the 2012 Summer Olympics
Olympic athletes of Spain
Mediterranean Games gold medalists for Spain
Mediterranean Games bronze medalists for Spain
Mediterranean Games medalists in athletics
Athletes (track and field) at the 2001 Mediterranean Games
Athletes (track and field) at the 2005 Mediterranean Games